German submarine U-973 was a Type VIIC U-boat built for service in Nazi Germany's Kriegsmarine during Second World War. The submarine did not sink or damage any craft.

Design
German Type VIIC submarines were preceded by the shorter Type VIIB submarines. U-973 had a displacement of  when at the surface and  while submerged. She had two shafts and two  propellers.

U-973 was fitted with five  torpedo tubes (four fitted at the bow and one at the stern), fourteen torpedoes, one  SK C/35 naval gun, (220 rounds), one  Flak M42 and two twin  C/30 anti-aircraft guns. The boat had a complement of between forty-four and sixty.

Wolfpacks
U-973 took part in three wolfpacks, namely:
 Werwolf (4 – 11 February 1944) 
 Boreas (2 – 5 March 1944) 
 Taifun (5 – 6 March 1944)

Fate
On 6 March 1944 U-973 was sighted by Fairey Swordfish 816/'X' operating from the British escort carrier , crewed by Sub-Lt(A) Bennett, Sub-Lt(A) Horsfield and PO Vines. Chaser was escorting convoys through Arctic waters. As they approached the submarine began firing with four 20 mm guns. Bennett fired three pairs of rockets, one of which struck the submarine just below the conning tower. The attack left 51 dead and 15 survivors.

References

Bibliography

External links

 Fleet Air Arm website, includes a summary of the sinking of U-973

German Type VIIC submarines
World War II submarines of Germany
U-boats sunk by British aircraft
U-boats commissioned in 1943
U-boats sunk in 1944
World War II shipwrecks in the Norwegian Sea
1943 ships
Ships built in Hamburg
Maritime incidents in March 1944